The IPSC Nordic Rifle Championship is a yearly IPSC level 3 rifle championship hosted in either Norway, Sweden, Finland or Denmark.

History 
 2001  Hell, 20-23. June
 2002  Steinsjøen
 2003  Borris, 31 May - 1 June
 2004  Oulu, 10-11 July
 2005  Elverum, 16-18 September
 2006  Borris, 27-28 May
 2007  Hamina, 14-15 July
 2008  Kongsberg, 12-13 July
 2009 (No championship held)
 2010  Kouvola and Hamina, 10-11 July
 2011  Copenhagen, 16-17 July
 2012  Herrljunga, 14-15 July
 2013  Snillfjord, 6-7 July
 2014  Kouvola and Heinola, 23-24 August
 2015  Copenhagen, 6-7 June
 2016  Snillfjord, 30-31 July
 2017  Karlskoga, 12-13 August
 2018  Hanko and Kirkkonummi, 7-8 July

Nordic champions 
The following is a list of current and past champions.

Overall category

Lady category

Junior category

Senior category

Super Senior category

Teams

References

DSSN Hall of Fame
IPSC :: Match Results - 2003 Nordic Rifle Championship, Denmark
IPSC :: Match Results - 2004 Nordic Rifle Championship, Finland
IPSC :: Match Results - 2005 Nordic Rifle Championship, Norway
IPSC :: Match Results - 2006 Nordic Rifle Championship, Denmark
IPSC :: Match Results - 2007 Nordic Rifle Championship, Finland
IPSC :: Match Results - 2008 Nordic Rifle Championship, Norway
IPSC :: Match Results - 2010 Nordic Rifle Championship, Finland
IPSC :: Match Results - 2011 Nordic Rifle Championship, Denmark
IPSC :: Match Results - 2012 Nordic Rifle Championship, Sweden
IPSC :: Match Results - 2013 Nordic Rifle Championship, Norway
IPSC :: Match Results - 2014 Nordic Rifle Championship, Finland
IPSC :: Match Results - 2015 Nordic Rifle Championship, Denmark
Shoot'n Score It :: Match Results - 2016 Nordic Rifle Championship
IPSC :: Match Results - 2017 Nordic Rifle Championship, Sweden
IPSC :: Match Results - 2018 Nordic Rifle Championship, Finland

IPSC shooting competitions
Shooting sports in Europe by country
Sport in Scandinavia
Inter-Nordic sports competitions